"Ready for the Weekend" is a song by Scottish recording artist Calvin Harris. It features uncredited vocals from British singer Mary Pearce. Written and produced by Harris himself, the song was released on 9 August 2009 as the second single from his second studio album of the same name (2009).

Background
The song features guest vocals by British singer Mary Pearce, who previously worked as a backing vocalist for Beverley Knight, Lionel Richie and Chaka Khan. Remixes by High Contrast, Fake Blood and Dave Spoon were also announced. It made its world debut on 12 June 2009 with Pete Tong on BBC Radio 1. On 13 July 2009 it was featured as the Song of the Day on Popjustice. Harris performed the song at the iTunes Festival '09 on 18 July 2009 in London. It debuted on the UK Singles Chart at number three on 16 August 2009.

Music video
The music video for the song was directed by Ben Ib and premiered on the British channel T4 on 4 July 2009 at 11:00 am. FHM model Lauren Pope and dancer Funda Önal make an appearance in the video. Several dancing females appear wearing red leotards to match Harris' magic portal, shirt and furniture. They next "change into blue and yellow zip-up bathing suits, expanding the palette and multiplying endlessly, just in time for the weekend."

On 23 July 2009, it was reported that the video was removed from YouTube due to a copyright claim from another party. Harris stated that he was upset it had occurred and believed that the British Phonographic Industry had prompted the removal. On 14 December 2010, the video was re-uploaded on Harris' official channel.

Track listings

Track listing

Track listing

Charts

Weekly charts

Year-end charts

Certifications

Release history

References

External links
 Interview: The making of "Ready For the Weekend"

2009 singles
Calvin Harris songs
Columbia Records singles
Songs written by Calvin Harris
2009 songs